Jean Lucas (25 April 1917 – 27 September 2003) was a French racing driver. He participated in one Formula One World Championship Grand Prix, on 11 September 1955. Lucas was then manager of the Gordini team, and when regular driver Robert Manzon was unable to race, he stepped in to take his place. His retired his car with engine failure and scored no championship points.

Lucas' best results as a driver were in sports car racing at the wheel of a Ferrari, winning at Spa-Francorchamps and Montlhéry in 1949. He retired in 1957 after a crash at the Moroccan Grand Prix.

Lucas was one of the founders of the French motorsport magazine Sport auto.

Complete Formula One World Championship results
(key)

References

French racing drivers
French Formula One drivers
1917 births
2003 deaths
24 Hours of Le Mans drivers
24 Hours of Spa drivers
Gordini Formula One drivers
World Sportscar Championship drivers

Carrera Panamericana drivers